President Pedro Aguirre Cerda Station was a Chilean Antarctic base, located at Pendulum Cove in Deception Island in the South Shetland Islands, inaugurated in 1955. The same year, the Falkland Islands and Dependencies Aerial Survey Expedition was established at Deception Island to help the survey of the Antarctic Peninsula, operating aircraft from Hunting Aerosurveys Ltd.

History
The Station was inaugurated on February 12, 1955, by the Defence Minister of Chile Tobías Barros Ortiz, when at that time the Commodore Jorge Gándara was in charge of the Chilean Air Force. The base was first designated with the name of the then President Carlos Ibáñez del Campo, but after the inauguration received the name of the former president Pedro Aguirre Cerda, in gratitude to his disposal of the decree that defined the Chilean Antarctic Territory in 1940.

The research was carried out on volcanology, climatology and meteorology. Since 1965, a weather office was in operation in order to elaborate national and international meteorological forecasts.

The base operation ended violently and definitively on December 4, 1967, when a volcanic eruption destroyed it. It was abandoned evacuating the 16 men who made up its endowment. New volcanic eruptions in 1969 and 1970 affected again the structures of the base.
The ruins of the base, including its meteorological and volcanological center, were declared in 2001 as Historic Sites and Monuments in Antarctica N° 76 under the Antarctic Treaty System, on the proposal and preservation of Chile.

Gutiérrez Vargas Refuge
Its purpose was to serve as a refuge for the members of the Station in the case of fire.

On December 4, 1967, the refuge was definitively abandoned, as was the Aguirre Cerda Station, due to a violent volcanic eruption. The poor remains of the refuge structure can still be seen on the beach where it was located.

See also
 List of Antarctic research stations
 List of Antarctic field camps

References

External links

 Official website Instituto Antártico Chileno

Outposts of Antarctica
Antarctic Chilean Territory articles
Outposts of the South Shetland Islands
Historic buildings and structures in Antarctica